The men's 4×200 metre freestyle relay event at the 1968 Olympic Games took place 21 October. The relay featured teams of four swimmers each swimming four lengths of the 50 m pool freestyle.

Medalists

Results

Heats

Heat 1

Heat 2

Heat 3

Final

References

Swimming at the 1968 Summer Olympics
4 × 200 metre freestyle relay
Men's events at the 1968 Summer Olympics